Cyber Bandits is a 1995 science fiction film directed by USC graduate Erik Fleming, with Visual Effects by fellow USC graduate Steven Robiner, and starring Alexandra Paul, Robert Hays along with lead Martin Kemp of the rock group Spandau Ballet; also featuring other actors such as Adam Ant, Grace Jones, and Kiana Tom. It was distributed by Columbia TriStar and released on DVD in December 2004.

References

Further reading
Auger, Emily E. (2011). Tech-Noir Film: A Theory of the Development of Popular Genres. Intellect. pp. 261–262.

External links
 
 

1990s science fiction thriller films
1995 films
American science fiction thriller films
Films about virtual reality
1995 directorial debut films
1990s American films